Konstantin Veiss (8 March 1896 Tallinn – 1962) was an Estonian politician. He was a member of III Riigikogu, representing the Estonian Workers' Party. He was a member of the Riigikogu since 7 May 1928. He replaced August Luik.

References

1896 births
1962 deaths
Politicians from Tallinn
People from Kreis Harrien
Estonian Workers' Party politicians
Members of the Riigikogu, 1926–1929